The Australian Children's Television Foundation (ACTF) is a national non-profit children's media production and policy hub.

The ACTF helps develop children's television policy; distributes and pays for Australian children's television series; supports new children's media; and develops screen resources for the education sector.

The ACTF provides funding and support to independent Australian producers and writers of children's programs.

History

The founding director of the Australian Children's Television Foundation, Patricia Edgar , was the driving force behind its establishment. As the chair of the Australian Broadcasting Tribunal's Children's Program Committee for five years, enforcing children's program standards and the children's drama quota Edgar argued that quality programs would not be made without a not-for-profit production company creating exemplary programs. Patricia Edgar's arguments caught the attention of the Victorian Minister for the Arts Norman Lacy, who invited her to work with him. They agreed to join forces to promote the proposal for the establishment of an organisation to achieve their shared objectives. Lacy then used his ministerial membership of the Australian Education Council and the Australian Arts Ministers' Conference to initiate the establishment of the Australian Children's Television Foundation. He appointed Edgar to the Arts Ministry staff to steer the project, provided office space and establishment funding, and won the support of NSW Education Minister Paul Landa with whom he co-chaired the early steering committee meetings.

In early 1981, Lacy addressed the Senate Standing Committee on Education and the Arts arguing for the strategic and national importance of a Commonwealth commitment to recurrent funding for the fledgling Foundation.  The Senate Standing committee report Children and Television Revisited recommended the establishment of an independent children's television production unit, which was the impetus for the foundation of the ACTF, to be funded by the Australian Government with contributions from state and territory governments.

Lacy's political advocacy and practical support coupled with Edgar's intellectual capacity and lobbying skills eventually won through, but before the ACTF could be established Lacy lost his Parliamentary seat at the election held in 1982. Patricia Edgar then turned her attention to funding support from the Commonwealth Government with the support of Dame Beryl Beaurepaire who was President of the Liberal Party. Ultimately, the ACTF was established with Commonwealth Government support collectively matched by all the state governments except Queensland with Edgar as the inaugural Director. She served in this role for 20 years, effectively kickstarting the Australian children's television production industry. Her programs include Winners, Kaboodle, Touch the Sun, Round the Twist, Lift Off, The Genie From Downunder, Sky Trackers, Crash Zone, L'il Elvis Jones and the Truckstoppers, Yolngu Boy, Noah and Saskia and the ground breaking Kahootz. Her programs won more than 100 national and international awards including four AFI Awards, two Logies, an International Emmy Award, the Prix Jeunesse, a Japan Prize, a Banff Rockie Award, a Grand Jury Prize at the New York Festival. Production value exceeded $100 million. 

After Edgar stepped down to produce Noah and Saskia for the ABC and the BBC, Jenny Buckland was appointed CEO in July 2002.

Major productions that the ACTF was involved with between 2002 and 2008 included Holly's Heroes, Mortified, Double Trouble(with CAAMA) and two series of Lockie Leonard. Mortified won more national and international awards than any other children's program in FFC history.

All those series were commissioned by commercial broadcasters, as a result of the quotas.  The ABC was only commissioning very small amounts of children's drama during those years and most of its shows, other than its in-house productions such as Play School and Behind The News, were imported.

In 2006 the ACTF publicly highlighted the opportunity afforded by the switch to digital television to provide a much better media service for Australian children, calling for the establishment of a dedicated digital public channel for children. Ultimately the ACTF joined forces with the ABC to champion this idea, which received support from the Howard government during the 2007 Australian election campaign.

The Rudd government gave the ABC funding which saw it establish its children's destinations on ABC2 (for pre-schoolers) and ABC3 (for school-aged children) in 2009.

ABC3 attracted new entrants and original programming ideas. New programs commissioned by the ABC and supported by the ACTF from 2009 include My Place 1 & 2, three series of Dance Academy, several series of Nowhere Boys, three series of Bushwhacked,  and more.

The history of Australian children's television and the ACTF are inextricably linked, with the ACTF playing a pivotal role in supporting distinctively Australian programs, and advocating for the support mechanisms required to produce those programs.

ACTF Chairman and Board

The ACTF continues to receive funding from the Commonwealth and all States and Territories (Queensland is now included).  Each State and Territory Government has the right to nominate a member of the board, and the Commonwealth Government may nominate three members. Those ACTF Board members may elect up to three independent board members.  There is a long and distinguished list of people who have been on the board over its 35-year history, but the most extraordinary contribution of all is that of Janet Holmes à Court.  Janet joined the board as a representative for Western Australia in 1983.  She was elected chairman of the board in 1990  and has been re-elected every year since.  She is now an independently elected member of the board.

The headquarters of the ACTF are on Smith Street in the Melbourne suburb of Fitzroy.

Awards

Productions 
Notable television series developed or assisted by the ACTF include:
Round the Twist
Dance Academy
Mortified
The Genie From Down Under
Li'l Elvis Jones and the Truckstoppers
Worst Year of My Life Again
Lockie Leonard
Double Trouble
Mal.com
Noah & Saskia
My Place
Lift Off
Johnson and Friends
Spellbinder (followed by its sequel series Spellbinder: Land of the Dragon Lord)
Touch The Sun
Winners
Yolngu Boy
You're Skitting Me
Crash Zone
Bushwhacked! (followed by its sequel series Bushwhacked! Bugs)
Flea-bitten!
Holly's Heroes
Kaboodle
Worst Best Friends
Legacy of the Silver Shadow
Sky Trackers
The InBESTigators
Little Lunch
The Flamin' Thongs
Wakkaville
WAC: World Animal Championships
Top Enders
The Gift
The Dukes of Broxstonia
Seen But Not Heard
Ready for This
Nowhere Boys (followed by its movie Nowhere Boys: The Book of Shadows)
Little J & Big Cuz
Hardball
First Day (followed by its TV series of the same name)
Escape from Jupiter (followed by its sequel series Return to Jupiter)
Dancing Down Under
C/o The Bartons
Balloon Barnyard
Mustangs FC
Wacky World Beaters
Songs of Innocence
MY:24
Desdemoda
Black Knight White Witch
Casa De Evil
Itty Bitty Ditties
Laser Beak Man
Mega Bites
Monster Chef
My Strange Pet
The Girl From Tomorrow (followed by its sequel series The Girl from Tomorrow Part II: Tomorrow's End)
Horace in Slow Motion
I Got a Rocket
The Valley Between
The Greatest Tune On Earth
Hoopla Doopla!
Lah-Lah's Adventures
Waabiny Time
Animalia
Australian Rules
Backyard Science (followed by its sequel series WOW! That's Amazing)
A Field Guide to Being a 12-Year Old Girl
The Funny Ones
My Brother Jack
Deadly
Dogstar
Boxwars
Handball Heroes
Language of Belonging
Paper Planes
The Big Wish
The Unlisted
DisRupted
Summer's Day
The PM's Daughter
Are You Tougher Than Your Ancestors?
Thalu
Red Dirt Riders
Kangaroo Beach
Kahootz

References

External links

Television production companies of Australia
Non-profit organisations based in Victoria (Australia)
Organizations established in 1982
Children's television
1982 establishments in Australia
Foundations based in Australia
Television organizations